The characters from the anime and manga series Gintama were created by Hideaki Sorachi. The story is set in Edo, the "Land of the Samurai", which has been invaded by aliens named Amanto, who subsequently coexist with humans. Despite the time, there are various advanced technologies and even spaceships which allow people to travel across space. Although the series' story is commonly episodic, there are also a few story arcs which are developed through various chapters.

The story starts with teenager Shinpachi Shimura who is saved from a group of Amanto attacking him by the samurai Gintoki Sakata. Shinpachi is amazed with Gintoki and decides to start working with him as a freelancer in order to learn "the ways of the samurai" while he helps Gintoki in work to pay the monthly rent from where he lives. Both also meet Kagura, a young Amanto girl who belongs to the Yato Clan, one of the strongest Amanto races. The three of them become known as "Yorozuya" and while they work as freelancer, they also come to meet Gintoki's former comrades during the Amanto's invasion such as the terrorist Kotaro Katsura as well as Shinsuke Takasugi, a major antagonist throughout the series. They also encounter several times the police force Shinsengumi, who normally ally with Yorozuya in their works, since they commonly involve dangerous criminals.

When creating the series, Sorachi developed various characters based on the historical Shinsengumi, which he is a fan of. Additionally, other characters from the series are also based on real people. The characters from the series have also been features in pieces of merchandise based on their appearances as well as video games. Response to the characters has commonly been mixed, with various publication praising the comedy situations and criticizing the artwork used in the series.

Creation and conception
Before the start from Gintamas serialization, Hideaki Sorachi wrote various one-shot manga. Although he considered the story Samuraider very poor, the setting of such one-shot served as the base for Gintama such as the addition of alien characters. While thinking of the name of a manga, Sorachi's editor commented "Do you think a silver samurai would be cool?" That inspired Sorachi to write the main character from the series after deciding the series should be named Gintama. However, the main character was originally meant to be Hijikata Toushiro as Sorachi was a fan of the Shinsengumi, most notably Hijikata Toshizō (the Shinsengumi who was the base for the one of Gintama), after he saw Burn! Sword!. When Sorachi could not "shake off" Hijikata's initial design, he decided not to use him as the lead character, but added him along with the Shinsengumi to the story. The pilot chapter from the series had a different plot to the one from the serialization: Sorachi kept adding Shinsengumi to the story such as Harada Sanosuke. As all of these characters were older than most of the recurring ones from the series, Sorachi removed them thinking they were not entertaining.

When asked by a fan if all the characters from the series were based on Real-Edo life citizens, Sorachi responded he was right and mentioned that Gintoki was roughly based on Sakata Kintoki, but added that he did not mean to make Gintoki a descendant from Sakata. Regarding character designs, Sorachi stated that all the characters' faces are based on Shinpachi as by just making a few changes such as modifying his hair a little and removing his glasses, people will get different characters from the manga. Sorachi has stated that he has liked all the characters he designed and whenever a character has been absent from the manga for various chapters, he tries to make him return. On the other hand, when a character appears too often, he does not want to make him star for the next chapters. However, he states that such "cycle" does not apply to the Yorozuya trio.

In response to comments regarding how the series is full of "losers" Sorachi stated he did not make that intentionally. Moreover, he views them as likable characters and states they are always facing their negative sides which helped them have friends. Before reaching the series' end Sorachi wishes to examine every character within the cast but at the same time there are part he does not want to explore fearing they would become less interesting due to a lack of mystery.

Main characters
Gintoki runs his business from a second-floor apartment, which he rents from Otose. As the name implies, such businesses involve performing odd jobs for a fee. Incidentally, he and Kagura also live there, and Shinpachi occasionally stays at the apartment. In later chapters, Gintoki reveals that prior to meeting Shinpachi and Kagura he worked in Yorozuya along with three people of African descent whom he threw to a river when they planned to abandon him or started dating other people.

Gintoki SakataVoiced by: Tomokazu Sugita (Japanese); Roly Gutiérrez (English; first anime series), Chris Patton (English; movie), Michael Daingerfield (English; third anime series)Portrayed by: Shun Oguri

 is the main protagonist of the series and is a samurai living in an era when samurai are no longer needed. He is recognized by his natural wavy hair and sweet tooth. He often blames his "perm" hair of sorts to be a source of some of his misfortune. Gintoki lives with Kagura and Shinpachi, taking on odd jobs to make the world a better place and to pay their rent. In the Joi war, he was known as the  due to his silver hair and white coat he wore in battle, which, combined with his impressive capabilities as a swordsman, made him famous among his comrades and struck fear into Amanto.

Shinpachi ShimuraVoiced by: Daisuke Sakaguchi (Japanese); Clay Cartland (English; first anime series), Mark X. Laskowski (English; movie), Cole Howard (English; third anime series)Portrayed by: Masaki Suda

 is one of the main protagonists of the series and is a teenager who joins Gintoki's freelancer business to learn the ways of the samurai. He stays at his family's dojo along with his older sister Tae Shimura. Both used to live there with their father who died when they were still children. In order to make their living, Shinpachi started working in a restaurant in which he met Gintoki when the former was being harassed by Amanto officials. Gintoki beats up the Amanto officials, not to stand up for Shinpachi, but to get revenge for his spilled parfait. Gintoki attempts to frame Shinpachi for the crime, and to make up for it, Gintoki helps Shinpachi save his older sister Tae from becoming part of a brothel as his father left them with an enormous debt. Although he commonly criticizes Gintoki's lazy behaviour, Shinpachi comes to regard him as a very important person to him in the same fashion as Kagura. Shinpachi also regards himself as the comic relief character from the series, but tends to take that as something important. As the readers' perspective, Sorachi notes that while he can be weak he will take action when necessary resulting in his growth across the series.

Shinpachi is easily identified by his glasses which he wears as result of hypnotizing himself to eat Tae's poor meals. When trying to identify Shinpachi, several characters tend to notice first his glasses even though he may not be using them; Gintoki comments that the reason for this is that most of Shinpachi's design are his glasses.  Despite his timid appearance, Shinpachi is a more than competent swordsman of his family's Kakidō-Ryu, the type of swordsmanship his dojo teaches. Shinpachi is also the captain of the "Otsu's Imperial Guard," an Otsu's fan club, and takes his role seriously. Other members of the fan club treat him with utmost respect, something he is not usually treated with. His fanaticism for Otsu started prior to her career when he was inspired by the effort she gave in her songs. His character is loosely based on the historical figure Nagakura Shinpachi, who Sorachi had previously used in one of his previous manga. Although he shares his last name with the Japanese comedian Ken Shimura, Sorachi picked that last name to fit his samurai heritage.

KaguraVoiced by: Rie Kugimiya (Japanese); Crystal Lopez (English; first anime series), Luci Christian (English; movie), Jocelyn Loewen (English; third anime series)Portrayed by: Kanna Hashimoto

 is the female protagonist of the series. She is a young Amanto girl who belongs to the Yato Clan, one of the strongest and most bloodthirsty of the Amanto races, although Kagura rejects that part of herself. She came to Earth to earn money for her family, and to escape her violent Yato heritage. She found work fighting for a gang of hoodlums, but when they ordered her to kill her target, she ran away. Not long afterwards, she meets Gintoki and Shinpachi, when they accidentally run over her with Gintoki's scooter. After they help her to make a clean break from the gang, she intimidates Gintoki into hiring her. Kagura and Gintoki have an odd brother-sister-like relationship and she commonly imitates his bad habits.

The Yato have "translucent" skin that is highly sensitive to sunlight, so Kagura carries an umbrella at all times. The parasol is also the Yato clan's weapon of choice; Kagura's umbrella is bulletproof and fires bullets from its tip. Because of her Yato blood, she is extremely strong and can stop a speeding motorscooter with one hand. However, she cannot control her strength perfectly; most of her pets, with the exception of Sadaharu, have all met an untimely demise at her hands. Kagura also has an unusually strong appetite, making her capable of consuming large quantity of food within a matter of seconds. Nevertheless, her tastes are endearingly plain.

Kagura is also somewhat of a tomboy, as she speaks in a blunt or perverted way. This is due to Sorachi not finding the too feminine characters believable and instead made Kagura from an anti-female lead perspective resulting in Kagura being the first female lead in manga to throw up. In the absence of Gintoki and Shinpachi, she is often seen partaking in games with various neighborhood boys. She regards Shisengumi's Sougo Okita as a rival and often competes against him. Her speech often ends in -aru, characteristic of the Japanese's impression of a Chinese accent. In Japanese, Kagura speaks in a stereotypical dialect that is associated with Chinese immigrants. In the English-translated manga, she punctuates her sentences with "yup", "uh-huh", "nope", and the like. Her character is based on Princess Kaguya from the story The Tale of the Bamboo Cutter while her name comes from a place on the island of Hokkaido. In a Newtype poll, Kagura ranked #21 for the top 30 most popular female anime character from the 2000s. Kagura was ranked #3 for most cheerful anime character in Animedia magazine's 2010 character awards.

SadaharuVoiced by: Mikako Takahashi (Japanese); Kyle C. Jones (English; movie)

 is an abandoned inugami who is collected by Kagura. He is named by Kagura, after her first pet. He was originally owned by a pair of miko sisters (Ane and Mone) who left him due to economical problems. Sadaharu chomps on anything smaller than itself, such as Gintoki's and other people's heads. Kagura seems to be the only one who can control him, for she has immense strength. Though he is dangerous when Gintoki first receives him, he becomes quite tame in the later chapters. He sometimes obeys Gintoki at certain points, and helps the main characters in many occasions. Kagura and Gintoki are often seen riding on his back, as he is big enough to carry two full-grown adults. The name Sadaharu is actually often used by Kagura for all her pets, whom all are dead. This Sadaharu is currently the 27th.

Supporting characters

Kabukichou's Residents
Kabukichou (歌舞伎町 Kabuki Town or District) is the place where the Yorozuya and Otose Snack House is set up at. It is unofficially under the jurisdiction of Kabukichou's elite four members, the Four Generals (四天王).

Tae ShimuraVoiced by: Satsuki Yukino (Japanese); Shelley Calene-Black (English; movie), Janyse Jaud (English; third anime series)Portrayed by: Masami Nagasawa

 is Shinpachi's older sister, referring to her as "Big Sis"(姉上: ane-ue). She runs the Kakidōkan Dojo, the family dojo, with her brother, working part-time to pay for the upkeep. She is usually addressed as "Otae" (お妙);  the "お" (O) is an honorific used to refer to women. She often mercilessly beats up Kondo Isao and Gintoki whenever they anger her, but she has a good side of her own. She almost always smile in front of her friends, one that might be called "a fake smile", since that she is actually feeling sad inside but she does not want to acknowledge it.

Her cooking skills are terrible, with her "special" tamagoyaki being so inedible that Kondo suffered amnesia after eating it and others are barely able to swallow it down. She has strong principles and believes in maintaining what is precious, even if it means throwing away honor and dignity. She believes that if apologies were enough, seppuku would not exist.

OtoseVoiced by: Kujira (Japanese); Jeni Hacker (English; first anime series),  Shelley Calene-Black (English; movie), Samantha Ferris (English; third anime series)Portrayed by: Midoriko Kimura

Despite constant arguments over Gintoki's general inability to pay his rent, she is confident in his defense of her. They both met shortly after the end of the war between samurais and Amanto when Gintoki swore to protect her after he ate food offerings that were meant for her dead husband. She was very pretty when she was young and worked at a restaurant. She secretly fed poor children dumplings for free, and was fired. She is one of the four "emperors" that rule the Kabuki District and has the personal title "Empress of the Kabuki District".

CatherineVoiced by: Yuu Sugimoto (Japanese); Connie Fernandez (English; first anime series), Luci Christian (English; movie), Saffron Henderson (English; third anime series)

 is an amanto who resembles a cat. At first, she seems to be a diligent worker at Otose's snack shop who is trying to support her family, but soon reveals herself to be a thief. Despite this, Otose hires her again after she is released from prison, and Catherine has since then become extremely loyal to Otose. She used to work as a thief with three other catlike amanto males. She speaks Japanese with an accent, represented by katakana characters in the place of hiragana; she is the only member of her former crew to speak this way.

Kishin Mademoiselle SaigouVoiced by: Hisao Egawa (Japanese); Alex Alvarez (English; first anime series)

 is one of Kabuki Town's Four Generals. Originally a member of the Joi resistance, Saigou left a legacy etched in history as he was able to single-handedly take down an Amanto warship during the Joi War. As he only wore a white fundoshi when he battled on the warship, he also became known as "Shiro-fun no Saigou" (White Sumo Thong Saigou).

Saigou has a son, called Teruhiko. He also owns an okama bar, and is the "mama" of the place. As his wife died when Teruhiko was still young, he takes up both the roles of father and mother to Teruhiko, and his outlook on gender therefore is blurred. However Saigou has no regrets about what he has become, as it was for his son's sake, and has said he would continue to live as he is. Saigou is also against anyone who makes fun of okamas.

Taizo HasegawaVoiced by: Fumihiko Tachiki (Japanese); Chris Jahn (English; first anime series),  Andrew Love (English; movie, miscredited to Christopher Ayres), Ted Cole (English; third anime series)Portrayed by: Fumihiko Tachiki

(Madao) is introduced as an official working for the Bakufu, but after an incident with Amanto dignitary Prince Hata, whom he was assigned to serve and protect, his superior asks him to succumb to his shame and commit seppuku, hearing which he ran away from his quarters. Although his wife, also leaves him, they never get divorced as both are still in love. Hasegawa initially believes that humans should focus on appeasing the Amanto, but after his encounter with Gintoki his mindset changes. Since then, he has been living a life of somewhat like a loser, getting fired almost every time he gets a new job, mostly due to the unfavourable look his sunglasses and goatee give him. No matter what, he refuses to remove his sunglasses because it is the only thing he has left to remind him of his successful past. He and Gintoki become friends and spend most of their free time gambling. His name is based on the historical Hasegawa Heizou.

Gengai HiragaVoiced by: Takeshi Aono (Japanese; until Gintama': Enchousen), Bin Shimada (Japanese; Gintama': Enchousen onward); Scott McNeil (English; third anime series)Portrayed by: Tsuyoshi Muro

 is Kabuki District's greatest mechanic. He wears a welding mask that covers his eyes, he has no hair and is recognized by a grey beard. Gengai's skills were used for the war between the amanto and the samurais which resulted in his son joining the Kiheitai to stop his creations. However, Gengai's son died leaving him with a deep emotional scar, and the Kiheitai's leader Shinsuke Takasugi convinces him to take revenge by killing the Shogun. However, his plans are foiled by the Yorozuya and the Shinsengumi. When his creation implanted with his son's personality refuses to attack Gintoki, Gengai abandons his hatred but is still a fugitive from the law. He also helps in repairing Tama, as well as help Yorozuya to stop the rogue robot from destroying the space port in the same arc. His name is based on the historical Hiraga Gennai.

MusashiVoiced by: Koichi Sakaguchi (Japanese)

 is homeless man who wears large glasses and an orange cap without pants. He seems to have many talents, including badminton. He is very similar to Hasegawa in that they are both often seen doing various odd jobs. Despite looking completely different otherwise, he is sometimes mistaken for Gintoki due to their similar hairstyles. He is eventually revealed to be the father of Ikumatsu and that his real name is Nishiki Matsugorou.

Katsuo KurogomaVoiced by: Katashi Ishizuka (Japanese); Brian Drummond (English; third anime series)

A small boss of the yakuza group Dobunezumi. Kurogoma's group tries to harass and extort money from the Takamagahara host club, but their plan is thwarted by the Yorozuya trio. Kurogoma also owns a female dachshund called Meru-chan, which he dotes on a lot, and recently Sadaharu has fallen in love with Meru-chan. As Sadaharu had saved Kurogoma from drowning, the latter gave Sadaharu the approval to date Meru-chan. Kurogoma also believes that the primary law in the universe is that things have to be in the ratio 7:3. His name is based on the historical Kurokoma no Katsuzo.

KyoshiroVoiced by: Atsushi Kisaichi (Japanese)

The number one host in Kabuki Town. He runs the  host club, which he opened together with his good friend Hachiro. Kyoshiro's real name is Hachiro Kuroita. His mother came to Edo to try to find him, but he was too ashamed to reunite with her, as he had undergone plastic surgery and had changed the face his parents had given him. However his mother had recognised him, but she was not angry; instead she left him a note to tell him that she would always be proud of him as her son.

HachiroVoiced by: Hidenari Ugaki (Japanese)

The bodyguard at the Takamagahara host club, and a good friend of Kyoushirou. He has a gigantic afro and his moustache is connected to his nose hairs. However, this was the result of a failed plastic surgery, and Hachiro was originally a girl, whose name was Hanako.

TamaVoiced by: Omi Minami (Japanese); Chantal Strand (English; third anime series)

, codenamed Fuyo Unit Zero, is an android found as a disembodied robot head by Gintoki. She was named by Kagura who was obsessed with eating egg on rice at the time. Tama is a robot created by Professor Ryuzan Hayashi to provide his sickly daughter with a companion. Hayashi tried to implant the personality of his daughter - Fuyou - into Tama, but the experiment killed his daughter in the process. Tama however, possesses the element known as the "Seed", and therefore retains some of Fuyou's personality and is capable of human emotions.

The android Hayasshi later begins a robot uprising, even hijacking the Terminal, in order to retrieve the Seed and Tama, whom he sees as the copy of Fuyou. The Yorozuya and Tama manage to stop Hayashi. In the aftermath Tama sacrifices herself to save Yoroyuza. Despite reconstructing her, Tama loses most of her memories during the showdown at the Terminal, remembering only that samurai are her friends. Her body is rebuilt, allowing her to become a complete robot maid again working at Otose's snack house. Acknowledging Gintoki's strength, Tama creates in her body a type of anti-viruses with the strongest and the leader of them, being identical to Gintoki.

Jouishishi (Katsura's Faction)

Kotaro KatsuraVoiced by: Akira Ishida (Japanese), Yuki Kaida (Japanese, young); Jason Kesser (English; first anime series), Illich Guardiola (English; movie), Matt Ellis (English; third anime series); Cathy Weseluck (English, young; third anime series)Portrayed by: Masaki Okada

 is Gintoki's former comrade during the Joi war. Even after the Amanto take-over of Japan, Katsura continues to resist the Amanto and has amassed a band of followers. Although he is an expert swordsman, his weapon of choice is a grenade. He is a wanted man due to his involvement in terrorist activities against the Bakufu, and was constantly on the run from the Shinsengumi. Although his initial methods were originally more violent in nature (for instance, sending a bomb to an Amanto embassy), Katsura has gradually grown to believe that there are people important to him in Edo, and decides that he no longer wants to destroy the country; nevertheless, he believes there should be a way to change it without sacrifices. In a past during the Joi-war when he and Takasugi are captured by Tendoshu, Gintoki comes to rescue them by getting himself captured. He needed to choose to either execute him and Takasugi, or their own teacher in front of their eyes. Katsura witnessed Gintoki's regret unlike Takasugi, who charged to kill Gintoki for choosing to execute their own teacher, ended up losing his left eye to Oboro. Katsura fully forgives Gintoki from the start, as it was already their teacher's wish for them to pass on his footsteps.

Since he is a wanted man, Katsura is often seen wearing disguises, although his identity is often still easily found out. One example of a disguise he seems to be fond of is a pirate's costume, complete with an eyepatch over his left eye and a scar on his right cheek, and using this he calls himself . Katsura sometimes works odd jobs to raise money for his terrorist activities.

As a common gag in the series, Katsura is often called . which is the Japanese word for "wig". Katsura indignantly replies "It's not [name]! It's Katsura!" whenever he is called something other than his name, even if he is in disguise. There are variations such as "It's not rap! It's Katsu-rap, yo!" His name is based on the historical Katsura Kogoro. He is mentioned in the manga My Hero Academia by Kōhei Horikoshi during its first popularity arc.

ElizabethVoiced by: Shinji Takamatsu (Japanese), Akira Kamiya (Japanese; Final Chapter movie), Takayuki Yamada (Japanese; live-action movie); Andrew Love (English, movie)

 is Katsura's pet being a present from Katsura's former comrade, Tatsuma Sakamoto. He resembles a giant white duck or a giant penguin. Although many people consider Elizabeth to be insane and extraneous, Katsura has named the ambiguous avian "Elizabeth" and dotes on it. Elizabeth uses signboards to "communicate", as well as an occasional means of attack. Although the true identity of Elizabeth is uncertain, it appears to be a man-like Amanto wearing a duck costume. In its first appearance, hairy legs are seen underneath his sheet and the body of a humanoid with glowing eyes is revealed as his mouth is opened just as it fell during another battle between Gintoki and Katsura. Although Katsura seems shocked at what he really is, he subsequently remains by his side. In the Renho arc, it is revealed that Elizabeth's real name is General Eren of the Renho race, a race of mercenaries specialized in covert operations, and he, along with many Renho, act as pets for numerous Earthlings in order to prepare Earth for an invasion. In the end, it turns out he is only the "Monday's Elizabeth", with the real one having disappeared from a trip and brought back a souvenir for Katsura.

In various episodes from the anime, Elizabeth's true identity is often joked to be Shinji Takamatsu, the anime director of Gintama.

Kiheitai

The  is secret volunteer army amidst the Jōi faction led by Shinsuke Takasugi. In existence since the war with the Amanto, they remain the only section who remain devoted to the original mission of violently freeing Japan from the grip of invaders, whether it be by the recruitment of soldiers or the development of weaponry that would destroy those who face them. The actions of Takasugi and the Kiheitai was once antagonize those who either have come to terms or who have blended in with the new society such as Gintoki or Katsura, until revealed to be a set by Tendoshu to kill Shige Shige and replaced by Nobu Nobu, Kiheitai will play most important supportive role in upcoming Boshin War. This is based on the historical counterpart, the Kiheitai.

Shinsuke TakasugiVoiced by: Takehito Koyasu (Japanese), Houko Kuwashima (Japanese, young); Donald Guzzi (English; first anime series), Kyle C. Jones (English; movie), Alex Zahara (English; third anime series), Kathleen Barr (English, young; third anime series)Portrayed by: Tsuyoshi Domoto

 is a former comrade of Gintoki Sakata and Kotaro Katsura during the Amanto invasion, and originally a major antagonist throughout the series until the near end of Shogun Assassination arc. He leads a radical Joi faction called the Kiheitai and is known amongst the Shinsengumi as one of the worst criminals. He is easily recognisable through his bandaged left eye, his colorful kimono, his eerie smile, and the pipe he is often seen smoking. He is a very proficient swordsman, being a perfect equal to Gintoki due to them clashing ever since they were kids. After the war ended, he vanished, and has since gained a dangerous reputation due to his assassination of many of the Bakufu's main officers and his planning of a large-scale coup d'état. It was revealed when both of him and Katsura are captured, and Gintoki is forced to choose to execute him and Katsura, or their teachers during Joi-war, Takasugi's left eye had been stabbed by Oboro after his last seen with his left eye sees Gintoki regretfully executed their own teacher as their teacher's path already passed to them if he died, thus unable to remember how regretful Gintoki were, and living his hatred towards the White Yasha, until he realized his mistakes that it was their teacher's wishes and remembers how he lost his left eye, thus starting to reconcile with Gintoki.

Unlike Katsura, he is not interested in saving the country: rather, he believes that the only way to save it is to destroy the "rotten" post-Joi war world. He is particularly resentful about this, as he claims that it has stolen their teacher- Shoyo Yoshida, who instructed him, Katsura, and Gintoki on the ways of the samurai- away from them. His antagonism with them drove him to make dealings with the space pirates Harusame in order to drive them off, offering Gintoki and Katsura's heads as the "ticket" to join. Sorachi himself mentioned in the character formula book that he "hates change", which provides another reason for his hatred of the changes that the Amanto brought about.  His name is based on the historical Takasugi Shinsaku.

Bansai KawakamiVoiced by: Takumi Yamazaki (Japanese); Andrew Love (English; movie), Paul Dobson (English; third anime series)Portrayed by: Masataka Kubota

 is one of the strongest swordsmen of the Kiheitai and the "right-hand man" of Takasugi. Bansai carries a shamisen and is skilled at playing it; it also doubles as a tool for tieing others up or as a weapon similar to a garrote, and he carries his hidden katana inside it.

On top of being famous as a skilled swordsman, Bansai is also a talented songwriter. He works as a music producer under the name , and Otsu's newer songs are written by him. Overall, Bansai is shown to have an extremely calm demeanor, although he is capable of violence when necessary and appears to take an interest in potential challenges to his skill. He has a strong sense of duty, and as such accomplishes the orders given to him by Takasugi- however, he is shown to interpret and carry them out based on his own values. He admires strength and spirit in others, and it was on this basis that he spares Yamazaki's life when Itou leaves him to finish him off. He speaks in the Japanese humble manner by using "de gozaru" at the end of the sentences and referring to himself as "sessha," a notably antiquated way of speaking. Despite this, he seems to use modern language when in his "Tsunpo" role. His name is based on the historical Kawakami Gensai, one of the four most notable assassins of the Bakumatsu period.

Henpeita TakechiVoiced by: Chafurin (Japanese); George Manley (English; movie); Ron Halder (English; third anime series)Portrayed by: Jiro Sato

 is the strategist of the Kiheitai. He uses a sword, but is not very skilled with it and gets fatigued quickly as seen when he fights Shinpachi during the Benizakura arc. He's often accused of being a lolicon, but he claims that he's a feminist. His name is based on the historical Takechi Hanpeita.

Matako KijimaVoiced by: Risa Hayamizu (Japanese); Carli Mosier (English; movie), Venus Terzo (English; third anime series)Portrayed by: Nanao

She is fiercely loyal to Takasugi. She is quick-tempered and prone to screeching when she's upset. This is evident when she has a "spitting fight" with Kagura after she spat at her and when she starts yelling at Kagura after her underwear is said to be stained. She interacts the most with Takechi, the schemer of the Kihetai, calling him "senpai" out of respect, but also calling him a "pervert" and a "lolicon" for sparing Kagura instead of killing her. In chapter 294 of the manga, she, Takechi, and Bansai send Gin a New Years card in order to receive more screen time. Her name is based on the historical Kijima Matabei.

Nizo OkadaVoiced by: Yutaka Aoyama (Japanese); Jay Hickman (English; movie)Portrayed by: Hirofumi Arai

, known as the "Butcher", is a blind hitokiri working for Takasugi. He seeks to destroy everything in the world, similar to Takasugi. His level of swordsmanship is such that he can slash an opponent without the latter seeing him unsheathing his sword. However, Nizou's sword was broken by Gintoki during their initial encounter. Recruited by Shinsuke, Nizo gains a new weapon, the high-tech bio-mechanical katana, crafted by Tetsuya Murata and used the weapon on various ronin to improve it with Katsura and Gintoki the only ones to survive him as he loses his arm to Shinpachi during his attack on the latter swordsman. However, having fire power equal to ten battleships and advance AI, Benizakura slowly taking over Okada's body, turning him into a bloodthirsty cyborg before he is eventually defeated by Gintoki. Though his fate is unknown, he is assumed deceased due to the effects of the Benizakura. His name is based on the historical Okada Izō, one of the four most notable assassins of the Bakumatsu period.

KamuiVoiced by: Satoshi Hino (Japanese); Christopher Ayres (English; movie), Ryan Luhning (English; third anime series)

 is Kagura's older brother. He is the leader of the space pirates Harusame's 7th squad, but he later becomes the admiral and teams up with Shinsuke Takasugi. He left his family after challenging his father and managing to cut off his left arm.. Although he usually shows a cheerful face, he is in fact a violent fighter who lusts for blood, like the majority of the Yato clan. He states his relatives are weaker than him for becoming attached to other people. However, he starts showing great interest in Gintoki's skills after he defeats his former superior, Housen, claiming him as his prey.

Shinsengumi
The  are the police force working for the bakufu, based on the historical counterpart, the Shinsengumi. After Shige Shige's death by the hands of Nobu Nobu's assassin, same time when Mimawarigumi takes over Shinsengumi's task, same time that their director and commander, Matsudaira and Kondou is about to be executed, Shinsengumi is disbanded, until it was later revived as special force against Nobu Nobu's tyranny. After rescuing Matsuidaira and Kondou, as a result of having loose most of their allies, including Sasaki, whose secretly aid Shinsengumi for Shige Shige's sake to protect their country, when the Bakufu is corrupted again by Nobu Nobu, like the time during Sada Sada's rule, the Joui observation leader, Katsura suggest them to leave Edo due to critical politics during Nobu Nobu's reign and being the face of the rebellion to stopped a return of corrupted Bakufu and Tendoshu because of their loyalty to their late-wise Shige Shige, despite want to protect the people in Edo, but has no choice to stay in a shadow with the Joui groups. In the later chapters, they return to protect Edo from the Amanto invasion.

Isao KondoVoiced by: Susumu Chiba (Japanese), Sachi Kokuryu (Japanese, young); Phil Dubois (English; first anime series), David Wald (English; movie), Jason Simpson (English; third anime series), Antony Kim (English, young; third anime series)Portrayed by: Nakamura Kankuro VI

 is the commander of the Shinsengumi. He is a bit goofy, but nevertheless good-natured and honorable. He takes his job seriously, and will not hesitate to sacrifice his life in order to protect the people. The members of the Shinsengumi are fiercely loyal to him, seeing as they revere him for being the one to give them back their swords after the Sword Prohibition Act. Shinsengumi Sougo Okita often remarks that Kondo's nice attitude is also his weak point as he never notices negative points about other people. Some characters in the series often call him "gorilla" and although he is angered with this nickname, he himself often adopts it. He has a crush on Tae Shimura and throughout the series continuously stalks her, to which Tae responds with merciless beatings. His crush is predicated on the fact that Tae answered yes when he asked if she would accept a man with hairy buttocks (which Kondo has). Along the series, Kondo appears fully naked several times with his penis pixelized; Kondo becomes proud of this, noting that he ranked 15th in the character popularity poll from the manga despite how embarrassing this is.

After the Shogun Shige Shige's death, he and Matsudaira were sentenced to death, supposedly due to their failure to protect the Shogun. He and Matsudaira were then rescued by Katsura, whom they joined forces with to oppose the new regime led by Nobu Nobu. After the Mimawarigumi revealed their true loyalty was also to Shige Shige, later Sasaki's sacrifice to evacuate one of their allies to escape, Kondou mourn his death. In latter day after the Bakufu, which is currently led by Nobu Nobu revealed to be corrupted publicly after a yesterday's rebellion led by the alliance of Shinsengumi, Mimawarigumi and Joui, Kondou spent his short time with Shimura siblings before departing Edo with their Joui, Shinsengumi and Mimawarigumi allies since Shinsengumi is now a face of rebellion against a return of corrupted Bakufu, after what Tendoshu and Nobu Nobu did to Shige Shige.

Kondo's character and name are based on the historical Kondō Isami while his original design was a mix between Taizo Hasegawa and himself.

Toshiro HijikataVoiced by: Kazuya Nakai (Japanese); Travis Roig (English; first anime series), Blake Shepard (English; movie), Michael Adamthwaite (English; third anime series)Portrayed by: Yuuya Yagira

 is the famed chain-smoking vice commander of the Shinsengumi. Purportedly the brains behind the force, he takes his work seriously, and is fiercely loyal to his commander, Isao Kondo. He is also hot-tempered and often threatens his subordinates with seppuku. However, despite his cold exterior, he does have a more compassionate side, as well as a tendency to cry after watching movies that are not particularly emotional.

Hijikata is obsessed with mayonnaise, and thus has the nickname . He has been known to smother everything he eats under a mountain of mayonnaise, and he carries a number of objects shaped like mayonnaise bottles, such as his cigarette lighter. He was popular with girls until they discovered this obsession. As a kid Hijikata was protected by his older brother, Tamegoro, from a group of criminals.  Hijikata fought them in his frustration over Tamegoro losing his eyes.

In one of his many fights Hijikata met Kondo, who invited him to join his dojo. There Hijikata met his future comrade and rival in the Shinsengumi, Sougo Okita, who often attempts to kill Hijikata so he can take over Hijikata's position as Vice-Commander, for revenge for attracting Kondo's attention, and also in revenge for rejecting Okita's sister's feelings. In reality, Hijikata did love Sougo's sister, Mitsuba, but he doesn't want her to get hurt and involved because of his dangerous reputation.  Sougo doesn't seem to understand why Hijikata rejected Mitsuba's feelings. Hijikata enjoys fighting and sees Gintoki as a rival in practically everything he does, from drinking contests to Rock-paper-scissors, ever since being defeated by him in battle. Contrary to his rivalry with Gintoki, both characters share many of the same traits, such as being afraid of ghosts and dentists.

In the series, Hijikata receives a sword that is cursed with the spirit of a hikkikomori otaku nicknamed  who was murdered by his frustrated mother. The sword causes Hijikata to act like an otaku, and makes him behave in strange and cowardly ways. After a long inner struggle between the two, Tosshi disappears from Hijikata during a contest to decide which group will be Otsu's official fan club. Based on the historical Hijikata Toshizō, Hijikata was originally meant to be Gintamas main character, but with his appearance being identical to the one of Gintoki.

Sougo OkitaVoiced by: Kenichi Suzumura (Japanese), Nami Okamoto (Japanese; young); Christian Vandepas (English; first anime series), Clint Bickham (English; movie), Vincent Tong (English; third anime series)Portrayed by: Ryo Yoshizawa

 is the best swordsman in the Shinsengumi. Although he is a master of kenjutsu, he frequently uses a bazooka. He tends to be light-hearted and somewhat childish, though his speech is heavily deadpan. In comparison to Hijikata, Okita is very lazy when it comes to his job as he is often seen taking naps when he is supposed to work. He is also known as a sadist, being highly skilled in torturing people without caring if it is somebody he knows. He also has a childlike or teenage appearance.

Okita displays an annoyance and dislike of Toshiro Hijikata, and continuously tries to heavily wound, embarrass, or even kill him whenever he has the chance in order to take his rank of vice-commander. Losing his parents at a young age, he was raised by his sister, Mitsuba. Consequently, despite his sadistic personality, Okita adores his sister and does everything he can to please her. He is also very fond of Isao Kondo, who took him under his wings when he was little. It is due to the fact Mitsuba was rejected by Hijikata and that Kondo became very interested in Hijikata that Okita hates Hijikata. Nonetheless, Okita still thinks of him as one of his three friends. Okita also regards Gintoki, whom he addresses as "boss" or "Master Gin", as one of his friends (with the other being Kondo) with the two finding common grounds in torturing and humiliating Hijikata. He is also a rival of Kagura following an unfinished rock-paper-scissors duel, and he usually calls her "China".

In the original Japanese manga he likes to end his sentences in '~desaa' and "~desuzee'. Sorachi originally designed Okita as a female, and wielding an umbrella, but had to change it to a male since only men are allowed in the Shinsengumi. His name is based on the historical Okita Sōji.

Sagaru YamazakiVoiced by: Tetsuhara Ota (Japanese); Clint Bickham (English; movie), Adrian Petriw (English; third anime series)Portrayed by: Junki Tozuka

 is a spy, whose specialty is naturally gathering intelligence. Formerly a street punk, Yamazaki is often caught by Hijikata playing badminton by himself during the time he should work, and he is subsequently beaten. Sorachi commented that he has no plans in explaining this gag since if he does it, "it'll ruin the joke". Across the series, Yamazaki becomes obsessed with eating anpan, sometimes taking it as almost an addiction. Despite having a rivalry with Shinpachi Shimura, they most often see eye-to-eye out of their respective groups. He is often seen cosplaying as a badminton-playing version of Ryoma Echizen  from The Prince of Tennis. His character is based on Shinsengumi's historical figure Yamazaki Susumu.

Kamotaro ItoVoiced by: Mitsuaki Madono (Japanese), Misaki Sekiyami (Japanese, young)Portrayed by: Haruma Miura

 is an advisor to the Shinsengumi who is later revealed to be a traitor whose ambitions of desiring to be recognized were used by Shinsuke Takasugi in an attempt to destroy the group from the inside. Unknown to Ito, he was merely being used as a sacrificial lamb by Takasugi, who never had any intention of letting Ito join the Kiheitai. As a child, Itou was neglected by his family for being a second born not worthy to be an heir despite his gifted nature, and by classmates jealous of his talents. As such, Itou grew to be cynical towards everyone. He considers himself a rival to Toshiro Hijikata and manages to get him suspended from the Shinsengumi, later attempting to assassinate Isao Kondo. However, his plan is foiled by the members of the Shinsengumi and Yorozuya. After losing his left arm and being defeated by Hijikata, he begins to realize how important the bonds he formed in the Shinsengumi were to him and how foolish it was of him to try and betray his dear friends. He is allowed to have one last duel with his old rival, in his weakened state and is allowed to die as a friend and a warrior. His name and role are loosely based on Ito Kashitaro.

Katakuriko MatsudairaVoiced by: Norio Wakamoto (Japanese); Kyle C. Jones (English; movie), John Novak (English, third anime series)Portrayed by: Shinichi Tsutsumi

 is the daimyo who acts as the direct superior to the Shinsengumi, though they often regard him as a violent nutcase. He has extremely violent tendencies, often seen wielding a pistol, or occasionally heavier weapons. He also believes that people who wear sunglasses are usually assassins, even though he himself wears them. He believes in other abnormal things such as righteousness is what makes up 80% of old men and the police being not more than a group of mafia community. He is also extremely protective of his daughter, Kuriko, recruiting the Shinsengumi to carry out a hit against his daughter's boyfriend. He is also a party-person and gets lewd when he is drunk. His character is loosely based on the historical figure Matsudaira Katamori.

Mimawarigumi
The  is an elite unit composed of high-ranking samurais rivaling the Shinsengumi who consist of ronin. He is skilled using both a sword and a gun. Her sword skills are seemingly higher than Kyuubei and has been described by Kondo as comparable to a grim reaper: each strike she makes is lethal. Despite their work for the Bakufu, Isaburo and Nobume are allies of Shinsuke Takasugi from the Kiheitai and plan to join for an unknown reason. After Shige Shige's death, Nobu Nobu strips Shinsengumi's status, as the Mimawarigumi takes over it, marking them as one of the final antagonists along with Nobu Nobu and Tendoshu. However, the Miwaramigumi's role as antagonists is nothing more than a facade, as their leader, Isaburo Sasaki was a victim of having his family killed by Naraku faction of Tendoshu, showing their true loyalty, like the Shinsengumi with Shige Shige, and had been planning to reform their country from a corrupted Bakufu that Sada Sada and Nobu Nobu had sold to the Tendoshu. The names of Isaburou and Nobume are respectively based on the historical figures Sasaki Tadasaburō and Imai Noburō of the Kyoto Mimawarigumi.

Oniwabanshu
A small band of ninja specialising in espionage, deceit and assassination under the Shogun.

Ayame SarutobiVoiced by: Yuu Kobayashi (Japanese); Jehane Serralles (English; first anime series), Carli Mosier (English; movie), Nicole Bouma (English; third anime series)Portrayed by: Natsuna Watanabe

 is kunoichi nicknamed Sa-chan from the Oniwabanshū. She meets Gintoki when she falls through his roof. When she tries to convince him that he had inappropriate relations with her, he briefly plays along despite knowing that she was lying to get his help. Ever since that incident, she has become infatuated with him, much to his exasperation. Her feelings for him seem to be encouraged, as she enjoys being put down and threatened by him, due to her extreme masochism. She often follows Gintoki and the rest of the Yoroyuza around much to his knowledge, throwing objects at her to come out when he needs her help. However, as the manga continues, Sa-chan appears less frequently in the series which tends to irritate her. She is extremely skilled as a ninja and acted as shoguns royal guard. She is severely short-sighted and often loses her glasses. Her attacks are mostly based on natto and bondage. Her name is based on the historical Sarutobi Sasuke.

Zenzo HattoriVoiced by: Keiji Fujiwara, Toshiyuki Morikawa (The Very Final) (Japanese), Motoko Kumai (Japanese, young); Brent Miller (English; third anime series), Lisa Ann Beley (English, young; third anime series)

 is a highly skilled ninja who sports a light-brown/dark-blonde mop top and a goatee. Initially introduced as a cloaked ninja assisting in the fraudulent "Dreamcatcher" scheme, his first notable appearance is when he and Gintoki attempt to fight to the death over the last remaining issue of a Christmas Double Issue Akamaru Jump believing it to be a Shonen Jump. He was originally a member of the Oniwabanshū. He is the only character in the series to equal Gintoki's obsessive devotion to Jump. He apparently suffers from piles, which is often joked about. He commands a freelance ninja team known as the "Shinobi 5." His father is said to be the strongest man in the Oniwabanshū, and an instructor to many of his peers, including Ayame Sarutobi. His character is based on historical figure Hattori Hanzō.

Yagyu Family
A noble family that serves the current Shogun.

Kyubei YagyuVoiced by: Fumiko Orikasa (Japanese); Brittney Karbowski (English; movie), Advah Soudack (English; third anime series)

 is an aristocratic young lady who was brought up as a male in order to succeed her family's clan. She dresses and behaves like a boy due to her upbringing, but occasionally shows her more feminine side. These facts cause several characters to mistake her as a boy during her first appearance. She was close friends with Tae Shimura when they were children where she fell in love with her, and lost her left eye protecting her when they were young. As a result of this incident, Kyubei wears an eye-patch across her left eye. The incident also left her with the determination to make herself stronger, and for many years she was training hard to improve her skills.

When she returned shortly before her appearance, she has already mastered the Yagyū-Ryū sword technique, becoming the second strongest member from her clan below her grandfather. She tries to keep her promise to protect Tae by marrying her but the Yorozuya and Shinsengumi defeat the Yagyu, claiming Tae's freedom. In the aftermath Kyubei realizes she herself is still weak and decides to keep training to become stronger. However, Kyubei is still insecure of her gender to the point she overreacts every time she touches a man. Kyubei's name is based on the historical figure Yagyū Jūbei.

Ayumu TojoVoiced by: Kouji Yusa (Japanese); Blake Shepard (English; movie), Brendan Hunter (English; third anime series)

 is Kyubei's servant, who is extremely dedicated in his concern for his young master. He generally speaks in a very polite manner, using -masu and -desu instead of the short dictionary forms usually employed in a normal male-speech. He addresses Kyubei young master, and has for years kept a diary recording Kyubei's activities. Kyubei is usually indifferent to Tojo's excessive attention, although she is often violent towards him. Tojo's eyes are normally closed unless he is surprised or under emotional distress. His name is a reference to the character Aya Tojo from the series Strawberry 100%.

Yoshiwara
An underground red light district in Edo.

TsukuyoVoiced by: Yuuko Kaida (Japanese); Marlie Collins (English; third anime series)

 is a blonde-haired woman with a scar over her forehead and left cheek. She leads an all female group of assassins, the Hyakka (Blooms of Yoshiwara), deployed by the Night King Hosen. Despite appearing to be a heartless person when approached by Odd Jobs, throwing a fake kunai to their foreheads, she later becomes friends with them. She has a difficult past being orphaned as a child, and raised by a ruthless and deadly assassin, Jiraia. While the original motive for Jiraia was to instill every bit of despair and tragedy of his own life into Tsukuyo, of who he refers to as his art or perfect creation, Tsukuyo ended up growing attached to what he did not manage to do. That is "Friends, A Home, and Precious Things To Protect" as told by Jiraia.

Her loyalty and home lies with Hinowa in the underground city of Yoshiwara. She has ties with Hinowa, who also helped raise her like an older sister/mother through her childhood. She has an extremely poor tolerance of alcohol and will get drunk quickly after drinking only a little. When working with Gintoki's group, Tsukuyo becomes more carefree and develops feelings for Gintoki, though she is reluctant to admit it.

Other characters

 Utsuro  Voiced by: Kouichi Yamadera (Japanese); David Wald (English; movie), Simon Hayama (English; third anime series)

 is the true main antagonist in Gintama series, and was the founder and first leader of the Tenshouin Naraku before that Oboro took his position. As a result of experiencing many deaths, Utsuro is shown to be emotionless, even fearless. His longing for death is shown in every appearance, and even though he is immortal, knowing that Kouka, who was immortal as well, died in the end, gave him a little hope. The only thing that awakens his interest is an opponent who seems to be able to kill him, just like Umibouzu. Utsuro is the personification of his name, for even Batou couldn't read his mind at all, since it seemed like an empty, unreadable vessel. As his former good-half Shōyō revived in a different new body, in the present day for two years after the first round of Battle of Earth, Utsuro begin to possess Takasugi's body at time of Shōyō’s revival. Unfortunately, Takasugi, helped by the late-Oboro's spirit weakens Utsuro via seppuku from killing the recently revived Shōyō for Gintoki to finish Utsuro once and for all, at cost of Takasugi's sacrifice.

JiraiaVoiced by: Yusaku Yara (Japanese)

 (real name ) is a former member from the Oniwabanshu as well as Tsukuyo's teacher. He was born in the country side to Iga Samurai, and had a talent for ninjutsu since he was a kid. During a fight, his family was destroyed and only Danzou and his sister survived. In order to protect his sister, Danzou had to work under the people he hated. Her sister, knowing that she was the problem, threw herself from a cliff. Jiraia burned his face and lived a life in solitude. He tried to kill the Shogun, but Hattori's father stopped him. In the end, to stop his pain, he decided to get killed by someone who resembles him. So he raised a student, Tsukuyo, and taught her everything he knew. So Jiraia came back to Yoshiwara to take Tsukuyo. He burned Tsukuyo's other weakness, Yoshiwara. But thanks to Shinpachi, Kagura, Hattori and Hinowa, the fire was extinguished. Gintoki went to save Tsukuyo from Jiraia, and the fight began. Jiraia was defeated by Gintoki, but when he tries to stab Gintoki from behind, he is stopped by Tsukuyo, like he wanted. He was the strongest man in the Oniwabanshu, and the one who created the Hyakka.

Tatsuma SakamotoVoiced by: Shin'ichiro Miki (Japanese); Alex Alvarez (English; first anime series), Christopher Ayres (English; movie), Andrew Francis (English; third anime series)

 is a former member of the Joi, where he was a comrade of Gintoki during the fight between samurais and Amanto. He is a good-natured man and optimistic to the point of being ridiculous, even in the most dangerous situations. He also has a tendency to misspell names; he calls Gintoki "Kintoki". Despite his goofy nature, Sakamoto is actually a successful businessman in the galaxy. He believes that business is a way of protecting his country. He has a private, well-equipped defensive business fleet called the  based on the historical Kaientai. He also believes that sacrifices should be made for the good of the community, which is why he chose to abandon his comrades on Earth to travel into space. Due to sea and space sicknesses, Tatsuma's business is mostly run by his first mate, Mutsu (herself based on the historical Mutsu Munemitsu). His name is based on the historical Sakamoto Ryōma.

Tsu TerakadoVoiced by: Mikako Takahashi (Japanese); Christina Jopling (English; first anime series)

 is a famous idol pop singer from Edo. Her song lyrics are controversial and sometimes have to be censored. She started her career singing on the sides of streets. Her talent was recognized by Bansai Kawakami, and she has since gained popularity. Her mother manages her while her father is serving time in prison. She manages to meet her father once again during her first concert. She is often referred to as "Otsu" due to her habit of making words using the last letter of previous words (Terakad-O-Tsu).

Prince HataVoiced by: Kouichi Sakaguchi (Japanese); Christian Vandepas (English; first anime series), Andrew Love (English; movie)

 is a purple alien living on Earth. He has an eccentric habit of collecting rare pets, but as he is incompetent in managing them, they often attack him or escape to cause havoc in Edo. The Prince is often known as "Baka Ōji" (Stupid Prince) due to his simple-mindedness and lack of responsibility with his animal collection. He is often accompanied by his butler  who is also annoyed by him.

Mitsuba OkitaVoiced by: Sumi Shimamoto (Japanese); Shelley Calene-Black (English; movie)Portrayed by: Kie Kitano

 is Sogo's older sister, who care of him since their parents died when they were children. Sougo cares deeply for Mitsuba, and is uncharacteristically polite and docile when around her. She is acquainted with the rest of the Shinsengumi, and regularly brings them extra-spicy senbei, which she herself enjoys. She suffers from tuberculosis, and often requires medical treatment, which Sougo used to send money for. She has romantic feelings for Toshiro Hijikata. Although it is revealed that Hijikata does in fact love her, he feels that he is unable to give her happiness for a right reason, that is why he treats her coldly. She dies in a hospital from Edo due to her disease after a brief conversation with her brother. Her name is based on Okita Mitsu, Okita Sōji's real-life sister.

IkumatsuVoiced by: Mayumi Asano (Japanese)

 is the owner of a ramen restaurant. She had a deep grudge against Joi participants, as her husband was killed by terrorism. Katsura worked at her restaurant when he was injured and hiding from the Shinsengumi. He repaid her favour by helping her during a crisis. Although she now knows his identity as a Joi participant, they are on friendly terms. Although Gintoki claims that Katsura is in a relationship with her Katsura denies it. Katsura later asks for Gintoki's help to find Ikumatsu's lost father. Her name is based on the professional name (genjina) of Kido Matsuko, the wife of Katsura Kogoro.

UmibouzuVoiced by: Show Hayami (Japanese); Paul Louis (English; first anime series)

 is the father of Kagura and Kamui and one of the last members of the Yato clan. He is the strongest alien hunter in the universe and known as a living legend to the people of Edo. He has a cybernetic arm due to his son claiming his original in battle. In such battle, Umibouzu almost killed Kamui which left him scared of his powers to the point he decided to abandon Kagura and his dying wife. He first appears in the series trying to make Kagura leave Gintoki and Shinpachi, afraid she would be unable to control her powers and that she would kill them. However, after knowing Gintoki and how Kagura is able to use her powers to protect people, he allows her to stay in Earth. After he leaves to travel the galaxy hunting aliens, he is next heard from in the form of a letter.

HousenVoiced by: Banjo Ginga (Japanese)

His title, "King of the Night", did not solely come from him being the ruler of Yoshiwara, the land of eternal night, but also from being known as "King of the Yato", an Amanto tribe that is averse to sunlight. Even amongst the dozens of powerhouses within the Yato tribe, the King of the Night was a powerful figure who built his own army. He is of comparable strength to Umibouzu, the most powerful alien hunter in the universe, one of the few who opposed Housen. Housen was eventually defeated by Gintoki, albeit with the help of sunlight and the Yoshiwara guards.

Lake Toya
The Spirit of  possesses the sword that Gintoki carries. He attempted to teach the Yorozuya an ultimate technique, the "Jumbolic Magnum," which sends the target flying into the sky with a single punch.  A side-effect of the attack forces the victim to shed bodily fluids from his body.  Unfortunately, none of the gang ever manage to learn the attack.

The spirit lives with his parents. His mother has an afro hairstyle with a white beard, and his father is constantly looking for a job. His father also has a sure kill technique, called the "Jack Nicolle," in which he shoots a beam from his bald spot.  Toya also keeps a pet, and it sheds a large amount of curly hair.  It is said that he was a fellow student to Taikobou, the main character of Hoshin Engi. Lake Toya enjoys eating fried cuttlefish, as evidenced by the contents of his wastebasket. He claims the contents of his trash, strange-smelling hardened tissue paper, are the remnants of the occasional cuttlefish feast, although Gintoki thinks otherwise.

Shigeshige TokugawaVoiced by: Yuuki Ono (Japanese), Eriko Matsui (Japanese, young); Lucas Gilbertson (English; third anime series), Riley Kramer (English, young; third anime series)Portrayed by: Ryo Katsuji

 is the Shogun of Edo. He rules Edo with assistance from the former Shogun and his uncle, Sadasada Tokugawa, whose crimes against Bakufu officers lead Shigeshige to nearly resign in order to stop him. Despite his good-natured personality and position, the Shogun is frequently mistreated by several of the series' characters with the Shinsengumi also failing to protect him. He also has a younger sister named Soyo Tokugawa, who is friends with Kagura. The real Shigeshige was revealed to be hiding in Oniwabanshuu, while the Shigeshige from before was a double, as well as revealing his childhood being raised and trained by the ninja clan, and has a scar on his back. He died in his sister's arms at night after being poisoned by an assassin. His name is based on the historical Tokugawa Iemochi.

Merchandise
Various types of merchandise have been developed based on the characters from the Gintama series such as plush, key chains, pins and figurines. Kagura's character was also part of Bandai's "∞ Puti Puti Petit Moe", a series of key chains featuring characters voiced by Rie Kugimiya which simulate Kugimiya's voice. Apparels from the characters include T-shirts with images or phrases from Gintama, Shinsengumi uniforms and bags for cosplay. In addition, they have appeared in several video games and trading card games based on Gintama. Besides video games from Gintama, Gintoki and Kagura also appeared in the crossover titles Jump Super Stars and Jump Ultimate Stars, which feature characters who appeared in manga series published by Weekly Shōnen Jump.

Reception
The characters from Gintama have been commented by publications for manga, anime and other media. They were praised for being very comic by Carlo Santos, writer for Anime News Network, who remarked Gintoki's personality as one of the main sources of comedy, noting his talking and reactions. However, he criticized the characters artwork as "the characters look more like they're doing static freeze-frame poses rather than actually moving." While reviewing volume 4, Santos noted Gintoki, Kagura and Shinpachi to have the only interesting stories from the manga, noting that "Nobody cares" about the ones from others characters such as Catherine. Although About.com writer Deb Aoki agreed with Santos about the problems concerning the characters artwork, she mentioned that was the only part which distracted her from enjoying the comedy from the series. She also added that the large number of characters featured in the manga has "lots of future comic possibilities." Comicbookbin.com writer Leroy Douresseaux praised the large number of alien characters appearing in the series, remarking Sorachi's artwork. However, in a later review he mentioned the "storylines here are mostly free of appearances by strange-looking aliens", but noted "the mélange of criminal ruffians and rowdy samurai makes up for it."

Popculture.com's Katherine Dacey did not find the running gags from the first volume to be funny, but instead she commented the strong point from Gintama was the characters. She mentioned the characters "add visual interest and life to every panel, keeping the reader invested when the stories stall" and found her favorite character to be Ms. Otose. The character development appearing in later volumes received mixed comments by Isaac Hale and Sam Kusek from the same site. While they commented that due to the fact the series is focused on its comedy, some characters' stories are not very deep, and they added that the series "succeeds by combining the two genres in a fun way." Alex Hoffman from comicsvillage.com commented on the large number of featured characters in the series, noting each of them have "distinct personalities" and make several appearances throughout the volume he reviewed. Despite criticizing the illustrations from the characters, Hoffman found that "the banter between characters is amazing."

ReferencesGeneralGintama manga written by Hideaki Sorachi and published by Shueisha. The first twenty-three volumes were published by Viz Media as Gin Tama.Specific'

Gintama
Gin Tama